The Jubilee Medal "Forty Years of Victory in the Great Patriotic War 1941–1945" was a state commemorative medal of the Soviet Union established on April 12, 1985 by decree of the Presidium of the Supreme Soviet of the USSR to denote the fortieth anniversary of the Soviet victory over Nazi Germany in World War II.

Medal Statute 
The Jubilee Medal "Forty Years of Victory in the Great Patriotic War 1941–1945" was awarded to: all military and civilian personnel of the Armed Forces of the USSR who took part in the Great Patriotic War of 1941 – 1945, to partisans of the Great Patriotic War, to the personnel of the Armed Forces of the USSR, as well as any other persons who were awarded the Medal "For the Victory over Germany in the Great Patriotic War 1941–1945" or the Medal "For the Victory over Japan"; to home front workers, who were awarded for their dedicated work during the Great Patriotic War Orders of the USSR, the Medal "For Valiant Labour in the Great Patriotic War 1941-1945", or other medals of the USSR such as "For the Defence of Leningrad", "For the Defence of Moscow", "For Defence of Odessa", "For the Defence of Sevastopol", "For the Defence of Stalingrad", "For the Defence of Kiev", "For the Defence of the Caucasus", "For the Defence of the Soviet Transarctic".

The medal was awarded on behalf of the Presidium of the Supreme Soviet of the USSR by commanders of military units, formations, the heads of agencies, institutions; by republican, territorial, regional, district or municipal military commissariats, the Supreme Council of the Union and autonomous republics, the executive committees of regional, provincial, county, district and municipal Soviets.

The Jubilee Medal "Forty Years of Victory in the Great Patriotic War 1941–1945" was worn on the left side of the chest and in the presence of other orders and medals of the USSR, was located immediately following the Jubilee Medal "Thirty Years of Victory in the Great Patriotic War 1941-1945".  If worn in the presence of orders and medals of the Russian Federation, the latter have precedence.

Description 
The Jubilee Medal "Forty Years of Victory in the Great Patriotic War 1941–1945" was a 32mm in diameter circular brass medal. On the obverse in the background, fireworks on both sides of the Kremlin's Spasskaya Tower within the relief outline of a large five pointed star positioned slightly off center to the right; the star's lower points superimposed over the relief image of laurel branches along the medal's lower circumference going halfway up both sides; at lower center going up three quarters of the way, the relief image of a soldier holding a machine gun, his right arm in the air, to his right, a female worker and to his left, a collective farmer.  In the upper part, on both sides of the tower superimposed over the star's outline, the prominent relief dates "1945" and "1985".  On the reverse along the upper medal circumference the relief inscription "WAR PARTICIPANT" or "PARTICIPANT ON THE LABOUR FRONT", in the center, the relief inscription on seven lines "40 Years of Victory in the Great Patriotic War of 1941–1945".  At the bottom, the relief image of the hammer and sickle over a Ribbon of St. George. On the medals struck to honour foreign nationals, the reverse inscriptions "WAR PARTICIPANT" or "PARTICIPANT ON THE LABOUR FRONT" were omitted. Ones with no inscriptions would be awarded to foreign leaders.

The medal was secured to a standard Soviet pentagonal mount by a ring through the medal suspension loop. The mount was covered by a 24mm wide red silk moiré ribbon with 2mm green edge stripes.  On the left side, against the edge stripe, the 10mm wide Ribbon of St. George.

Recipients (partial list) 
The individuals below were all recipients of the Jubilee Medal "Forty Years of Victory in the Great Patriotic War 1941–1945".

Soviets 
 Admiral of the Fleet Sergey Gorshkov
 Marshal of the Soviet Union Sergey Akhromeyev
 Marshal of the Soviet Union Sergei Sokolov
 Rocket scientist Boris Chertok
 Actress Elina Bystritskaya
 Marshal of the Russian Federation and Defence Minister Igor Sergeyev
 World War II combat pilot Natalya Meklin
 Musician Bahram Mansurov
 Military artist Lev Kerbel
 World War II fighter pilot Vasily Afonin
 Last General Secretary of the Communist Party of the Soviet Union Mikhail Sergeyevich Gorbachev
 Marshal of Aviation Alexander Ivanovich Pokryshkin
 Major General Vladimir Sergeyevich Ilyushin
 Captain Vasil Uładzimiravič Bykaŭ
 Colonel General Pavel Alekseyevich Kurochkin
 Colonel General Leonid Mikhaylovich Sandalov
 Colonel Ilya Grigoryevich Starinov
 Lieutenant Colonel Vasily Maximovich Afonin
 Captain 1st grade Ivan Vasilyevich Travkin
 Lieutenant General Galaktion Yeliseyevich Alpaidze
 Scientist Yuri Andreevich Yappa

Foreign recipients 
 Chief Petty Officer Bill Stone (UK)
 General and President Wojciech Jaruzelski (Poland)
 General Michał Rola-Żymierski (Poland)
 Reverend Laurie Biggs (Australia)
 United States Merchant Marine Officer Romuald Paul Holubowicz (US/UK)
 United States Merchant Marine Navigation Officer Carl M. Metzger (US)
 Chief Petty Officer Bill Boddy
 Edward Makuka Nkoloso (Zambia)
 United States Merchant Marine, Herbert Fred Bennett (Boston, Mass, USA)
 Chief of Staff Hoàng Văn Thái (Vietnam)
 Sergeant Victor Miller (Royal Australian Air Force)
 Lieutenant Lionel Dennis Hook (RN officer)
 Chief ERA William Peel  Royal Navy  (Submarines) - UK- North Sea 1945
 President Ferdinand E. Marcos, (Philippines)
 Major General Yordan Milanov (Bulgaria)
 Piotr Fyodor Krakowski (soldier), (United States)
 United States Merchant Marine Donald A. Paschal (US)

See also 
Great Patriotic War
Orders, decorations, and medals of the Soviet Union
Badges and Decorations of the Soviet Union

References

External links 
 Legal Library of the Soviet Union

Military awards and decorations of the Soviet Union
1985 establishments in the Soviet Union
Civil awards and decorations of the Soviet Union
Awards established in 1985